Highway 17 (AR 17, Ark. 17 and Hwy. 17) is a designation a state highway in the U.S. state of Arkansas. The highway is located mainly in Eastern Arkansas and is split into seven segments, though two sets of segments are directly connected. The third and longest section begins at US Route 49 north of Brinkley and ends at AR 14 in Newport.

Route description

Ward Reservoir to La Grue Bayou
The route begins near the Ward Reservoir in southern Arkansas County. From there, the route heads north, until reaching a three-way intersection with Arkansas Highway 152 at DeLuce. The route serves virtually no purpose.

Ethel to Brinkley
The route begins at Morgan Hill Road south of Ethel. From there, the route heads north for about  until it reaches the intersection of Highway 1 near St. Charles. The route continues north, sharing a concurrency with Highway 146 and a separate concurrency with Highway 86 in Holly Grove. The route heads north again, intersecting Highway 241 near Keevil and Highway 302 right before the route's northern terminus at US Route 70 south of Brinkley.

Brinkley to Newport
The route begins at US Route 49 in Brinkley, just north of Interstate 40 (I-40). The route heads north for about  before intersecting Highway 38 in Cotton Plant. Between Brinkley and Cotton Plant, the highway is designated as the "Sister Rosetta Tharpe Memorial Highway". Both highways share a concurrency heading east for about  before heading north again. From there, the route continues to head north, intersecting Highway 306 north of Cotton Plant, and Highway 260 sharing a concurrency south of Patterson. The route will come to another three-way intersection with US Route 64 in Patterson, and will share a concurrency with US Route 64 for about  until turning north in McCrory at the intersection of US Route 64 and Highway 145. The route continues towards Newport, intersecting Highway 37 north of McCrory, and Highway 33 sharing a concurrency near Tupelo, as well as the towns of Weldon and Auvergne. Highway 17 will eventually intersect Highway 14 near Newport and will soon intersect US Route 67/Future Interstate 57 in Newport, and shortly after that, highway 17 will re-intersect highway 14 at its northern terminus in Newport.

Diaz to Tuckerman
The route begins at Highway 18 in Diaz, just north of Highway 69. The route intersects Highway 226 just south of the northern terminus.

Major intersections

References

External links

018
Transportation in Arkansas County, Arkansas
Transportation in Monroe County, Arkansas
Transportation in Woodruff County, Arkansas
Transportation in Jackson County, Arkansas